WKWP (88.1 FM) is a Christian adult contemporary radio station licensed to Williamsport, Pennsylvania. It is owned by Educational Media Foundation and is an affiliate of its K-Love network.

History
The station was first licensed March 5, 1980, holding the call sign WWAS, and was owned by Williamsport Area Community College (now known as the Pennsylvania College of Technology). On September 3, 2013, the Federal Communications Commission approved transfer of the broadcast license for the then-WPTC to Todd Bartley's Williamsport Lycoming Broadcast Foundation, a local non-profit organization, at a purchase price of $125,000.

Effective December 15, 2017, the station was sold to Educational Media Foundation for $160,000. The station changed its call sign to WKWP on January 22, 2018.

References

External links
 

K-Love radio stations
Educational Media Foundation radio stations
Contemporary Christian radio stations in the United States
KWP
Radio stations established in 1980
1980 establishments in Pennsylvania